Skiu (also Sku and Skyu) and Kaya (elev. 3500 m) are adjacent villages in the Markha River valley in Ladakh, India.  The villages contain 9 and 12 households, respectively; the boundary between the villages is not clearly defined. They lie within the Hemis National Park.

Wheat and vegetables are cultivated by villagers, who also harvest wild seabuckthorn berries.

Skiu and Kaya each have a Buddhist monastery (gompa). The monastery at Skiu was constructed in the 11th century; Rinchen Zangpo laid its foundation.

References

Villages in Leh tehsil